Beverly Hills Pawn is an American TV show filmed in Beverly Hills, California.

Description
It is filmed in The Dina Collection pawn shop owned by Yossi Dina who appears on the show along with his employees Aria, Cory, and manager Dominique.

Location
The Dina Collection is a high-end pawn shop catering to the upper class clients in Beverly Hills. Along with handling jewelry, The Dina Collection also deals in Hollywood memorabilia. The show is frequented by many mostly-former celebrities.

References

External links
The Futon Critic
Official website of The Dina Collection

2010s American reality television series
2013 American television series debuts
2015 American television series endings